Granville William Gresham Leveson-Gower JP DL FSA (25 February 1838 – 30 May 1895) was a British Liberal Party politician.

Early life
Leveson-Gower was born on 25 February 1838 in the prominent Leveson-Gower family. He was the son of William and Emily Josephine Eliza (née Doyle) Leveson-Gower. He was a great-great grandson of John Leveson-Gower, 1st Earl Gower, descending from his youngest son, John Leveson-Gower, a Royal Navy officer.

Career
Leveson-Gower was elected Liberal MP for Reigate at a by-election in 1863—caused by the succession of William Monson to the peerage as Lord Monson—and held the seat until 1866 when he was unseated due to extensive bribery in the seat. The seat was later disenfranchised under the Reform Act 1867.

Personal life
In 1861, he married The Hon. Sophia Leigh LJStJ, daughter of Chandos Leigh, 1st Baron Leigh and Margarette (née Willes) Leigh. Sophia's brothers included Sir Edward Chandos Leigh, QC, and James Wentworth Leigh. Together, they lived at Titsey Place, Surrey and had at least ten children:

 Margaret Emily Leveson-Gower (1862–1948)
 Ronald William Leveson-Gower (1863–1889)
 Granville Charles Leveson-Gower (1865–1948)
 Ethel Sophie Leveson-Gower (1866–1950)
 Frederick Archibald Leveson-Gower (1871–1946)
 Evelyn Marmaduke Leveson-Gower (1872–1938)
 Henry Dudley Leveson-Gower (1873–1954)
 Cecil Octavius Leveson-Gower (1875–1937)
 Clement Edward Leveson-Gower (1876–1939)
 Katherine Ursula Leveson-Gower (1878–1963).

Leveson-Gower died on 30 May 1895.

References

External links
 

UK MPs 1859–1865
UK MPs 1865–1868
1838 births
1895 deaths
Liberal Party (UK) MPs for English constituencies